Harith Noah (born 29 January 1993 in Germany) is a professional motorsports athlete from Shoranur in Kerala, India. He represents India in international cross country rallies such as the Dakar Rally. He is a 5-time Indian National Supercross champion. Since 2018, he is taking part in cross-country rallies and made his debut at Dakar in 2020. In 2021, Harith completed the Dakar Rally and became the first Cross-country rally-raid athlete representing India to have finished in the top-20. He is the fastest rider from India at Dakar with a highest ranking of P18 in a Dakar stage in 2022. He beat his own record of P19 which he set in 2021. He completed three Dakar Rallies and is one of the four Indians to have taken part in Dakar. He beat CS Santosh record of P34, finishing Dakar in P20 on 15 Jan 2021. In July 2022, Harith Noah competed in the FIM Baja Spain Aragon, the fourth round of the FIM Bajas World Cup and finished a creditable fourth behind his Sherco TVS Factory teammates Lorenzo Santolino and Rui Goncalves.

Early career

Harith Noah studied at Sholai School in Kodaikanal in Tamil Nadu. He started racing local dirt track events at the age of 16, in 2009. Later, in 2011 he started taking part in the National supercross championship. In 2012, he did a 3-month training course in US. He won the title the same year and was recruited by TVS Factory Racing in 2012. He is a graduate of Manchester Metropolitan University with a bachelor's degree in Sports Science.

Motorsport career

Harith Noah raced and won his first National Supercross title in 2011 in the SX2 category as a privateer. He was recruited by TVS Racing in 2012. and won four more national championships in the years, 2012, 2014, 2017, and 2018. In 2018, Harith Noah raced his first-ever international cross-country race, the Rallye Du Maroc. In 2019, he participated in Baja Aragon and finished 7th overall. In 2020, he finished Dakar Rally in the 'Dakar Experience' Category. In 2021, Harith Nah completed the Dakar Rally, the world's toughest cross-country rally, and became the first rider from India to finish in the top-20 overall. Harith Noah, the TVS Racing factory rider, entered the Dakar 2021 as a privateer, with TVS not entering as an official team but only supporting him along with Sherco Rally Factory Team, which provided the service. He bettered the mark of CS Santosh who is the first Indian to finish Dakar, in 36th place.

Taking part in his third Dakar in 2022, Harith Noah survived two falls and fractured ribs to complete nine stages as on 11 January 2022. He entered as a privateer supported by TVS Racing factory team and serviced by Sherco TVS Rally Factory team which has a tie-up with TVS Motor Company. He finished his third Dakar in the Dakar Experience Class and remains the best from India at Dakar with a record of 20th place.

References

Indian motorsport people
Indian motorcycle racers
Living people
People from Kerala
1993 births